Together: Edgar Winter and Johnny Winter Live is a 1976 album by brothers Johnny Winter (guitar, vocals) and Edgar Winter (saxophone, vocals). Released just three months after Johnny Winter's Captured Live!, it is composed entirely of rock and roll and soul standards.

It was recorded at San Diego Sports Arena and Swing Auditorium.

Track listing
"Harlem Shuffle" (Relf, Nelson) - 3.52
"Soul Man" (Porter, Hayes) - 3.03
"You've Lost That Lovin' Feelin'"  (Mann, Weil, Spector) - 5.19
"Rock & Roll Medley": "Slippin' and Slidin'"/"Jailhouse Rock"/"Tutti Frutti"/"Sick & Tired"/"I'm Ready"/"Reelin' & Rockin'"/"Blue Suede Shoes"/"Jenny Take A Ride"/"Good Golly Miss Molly" (Penniman, Bocage, Collins, Smith/Lieber, Stoller/Penniman, LaBostrie/Kenner, Bartholemew/King, Durand, Obichaux/Berry/Perkins/Penniman, Johnson, Crewe/Blackwell, Marascalco) - 6.15
"Let the Good Times Roll" (Lee) - 3.29
"Mercy, Mercy" (Covay, Miller) - 4.10
"Baby, Whatcha Want Me to Do" (Reed) - 11.06

Personnel
Johnny Winter - guitar, vocals
Edgar Winter - saxophone, vocals
Rick Derringer - guitar
Floyd Radford - guitar
Randy Jo Hobbs - bass
Dan Hartman - piano
Richard Hughes - drums
Chuck Ruff - drums

References

Johnny Winter albums
Edgar Winter albums
1976 live albums
Albums produced by Johnny Winter
Collaborative albums
Blue Sky Records live albums
Live blues rock albums